Louis Leprince-Ringuet (27 March 1901, in Alès – 23 December 2000, in Paris) was a French physicist, telecommunications engineer, essayist and historian of science.

Leprince-Ringuet advocated strongly for the creation of the European Organization for Nuclear Research (CERN) and remained its indefatigable supporter. He was vice chair (1956–69) and chair (1964–66) of CERN’s scientific policy committee. He was elected to the American Philosophical Society.

He is known for early discovery of the kaon. He also coined the term hyperon in 1953.

Honors 

  from CNRS and École polytechnique, and part of the French National Institutes of Nuclear and Particle Physics (IN2P3), was named in his honour.

References

1901 births
2000 deaths
École Polytechnique alumni
Télécom Paris alumni
Supélec alumni
People from Alès
French physicists
French telecommunications engineers
French electrical engineers
Grand Officiers of the Légion d'honneur
Historians of science
Members of the Académie Française
Members of the French Academy of Sciences
20th-century French historians
French male essayists
20th-century French essayists
20th-century French male writers
People associated with CERN
Members of the American Philosophical Society